Edward Rede (by 1476 – 26 October 1544), of Norwich, Norfolk, was an English politician.

He was a Member of Parliament (MP) for Norwich in 1529 and mayor of the city in 1521-22, 1531–32 and 1543-44.

References

15th-century births
1544 deaths
Mayors of Norwich
English MPs 1529–1536